Edward "Ed" Skyler is an American politician and businessperson. He was Deputy Mayor for Operations for New York City, the youngest deputy mayor in New York City's history.  In 2010, he was named the senior public and governmental relations executive at Citigroup.

Education
Skyler, a member of the New York State Bar, was graduated from the University of Pennsylvania and Fordham University's School of Law.

Career 
Prior to his appointment as Deputy Mayor for Operations, Skyler served as Deputy Mayor for Administration. Skyler worked at the New York City Department of Parks & Recreation from 1995 to 1999, where he served as deputy chief of staff and as the public information director. He was a deputy press secretary to Mayor Rudolph W. Giuliani. In 2000, Skyler left Giuliani's administration to work at Bloomberg LP's Corporate Communications group.

In 2001, aged 28, he joined Bloomberg for Mayor as the campaign's press secretary. Skyler served in that position through the transition during which time he was appointed Press Secretary to the incoming mayor. His successor was Stu Loeser.

In 2010 Skyler joined Citigroup as an Executive Vice President for Global Public Affairs.

Personal life 
On March 4, 2009, Skyler, who stands 6 feet, 4 inches, tackled a mugger in midtown Manhattan after a young woman "began screaming [that] she had just been robbed" and he recovered her BlackBerry.

References

External links
Biography of Edward Skyler on NYC.gov
Official Press Release Announcing Appointment as Deputy Mayor for Operations
So What Do You Do, Ed Skyler?, Interview with MediaBistro.com

1973 births
Living people
Fordham University School of Law alumni
University of Pennsylvania alumni